RR Caeli is an eclipsing binary star in the constellation Caelum. It is 69 light years from Earth.

Properties
RR Caeli was first noted to be a high-proper motion star in 1955 by Jacob Luyten, and given the designation LFT 349.

This star system consists of a red dwarf of spectral type M6 and a white dwarf that orbit each other every seven hours; the former is 18% as massive as the Sun, while the latter has 44% of the Sun's mass. The red dwarf is tidally locked with the white dwarf, meaning it displays the same side to the heavier star. The system is also a post-common-envelope binary, and the red dwarf star is transferring material onto the white dwarf. In approximately 9–20 billion years, RR Caeli will likely become a cataclysmic variable star due to the period's gradual shortening, leading to increasing rates of transfer of hydrogen to the surface of the white dwarf. The white dwarf is likely to have a plain helium core, as its density is too low for the carbon-oxygen core.

Discovered to be an eclipsing binary in 1979, it has a baseline magnitude of 14.36, dimming markedly every 7.2 hours for an interval of around 10 minutes, due to the total eclipse of the hotter star by the cooler one. Its variability in brightness led to its being given the variable star designation RR Caeli in 1984.  There are very shallow secondary eclipses where the white dwarf transits across the red dwarf.

Planetary system 

In 2012, analysis of slight variations in the observed light curve of the system showed that there was likely a giant planet about four times as massive as Jupiter orbiting the pair of stars with a period of 11.9 years, and that there was also evidence for a second possible substellar body further out. More observations of the light curve are likely to help confirm the presence of one or both planets. A two-planet model was presented in a 2021 preprint, but has not been published in a journal or peer-reviewed. A 2022 study found that at least the 2012 model fails to predict recent changes in eclipse timing, suggesting that a different explanation for the eclipse timing variations may be needed.

Notes

References

Caelum
Eclipsing binaries
Caeli, RR
M-type main-sequence stars
White dwarfs
Hypothetical planetary systems
J04210556-4839070